Konami Krazy Racers, known in Japan as , is a kart racing video game published and developed by Konami for the Game Boy Advance handheld video game console. It was first released in Japan, and was later released in North America and some PAL regions. It was also re-released for Wii U Virtual Console on October 15, 2015 in Europe. It was a launch game for the system. Konami Krazy Racers makes use of a variety of characters and concepts from several of Konami's franchises, including Castlevania, Metal Gear, and Gradius. It plays similarly to the Mario Kart series, with eight characters per circuit and offensive/defensive items placed at predetermined points in the tracks.

Konami Krazy Racers received mostly positive reviews.

Gameplay

Konami Krazy Racers plays similarly to other kart racing games, most notably Mario Kart Super Circuit. Each race begins at the starting line, where eight racers are lined up in certain positions. Each of the seven computers are placed in the closest seven positions to the starting line, but the player character always starts a circuit in eighth place. This placement may change in the next race of the circuit depending on how well the racers do. If the player places first, he or she will be in the first position, as the placement in the following races is based on how the racers did in the previous race. The race is seen from behind the player, and uses Mode 7 effects to simulate the three dimensions. A timer will count down to indicate the beginning of the race, and the player must hold down a button to accelerate at the beginning. The player can pick up coins off of the track which may be spent on items in a shop, and depending on the character the player controls, he or she may try to cause another player to spin-out. The player may use other buttons to do such actions as jump and brake, which aides in maneuverability.

Placed throughout the races are red and blue bells. The red bells contain any variety of items, while the blue bell contains a speed-boosting item.

Characters
Konami Krazy Racers features a total of 12 characters, each with unique features, including weight, speed, and acceleration.

 Goemon - The player character from the Legend of the Mystical Ninja series.
 Takosuke - A player character from the Parodius series.
 Dracula - The most significant antagonist of the Castlevania series.
 Gray Fox - A supporting character from Metal Gear.
 Pastel - A player character from the TwinBee series.
 Power Pro-kun - A character from the Power Pros series.
 Moai - An enemy from the Gradius series.
 Nyami - A character from the Pop'n Music series.
 Bear Tank - A character from Rakugakids.
 King - A character from the Pop'n Music series.
 Vic Viper - The player character from the Gradius series.
 Ebisumaru - A character from the Legend of the Mystical Ninja series.

Reception

The game received "generally favorable reviews" according to the review aggregation website Metacritic. NextGen, however, said that the game "will easily keep you occupied until [Mario Kart: Super Circuit] arrives. And for some time after, too." In Japan, Famitsu gave it a score of 25 out of 40.

It was ranked #10 on a top ten list of the best Game Boy Advance games in Electronic Gaming Monthly, beating Mario Kart: Super Circuit, another Game Boy Advance kart racing game.

Sequel
Krazy Kart Racing is a sequel to the title for iOS and Android, featuring a total of 12 characters from Konami franchises, including new ones not in the previous game. It received above-average reviews according to the review aggregation website GameRankings. Pocket Gamer gave it three-and-a-half stars out of five.

Notes

References

External links

2001 video games
Kart racing video games
Game Boy Advance games
Android (operating system) games
Virtual Console games
Virtual Console games for Wii U
IOS games
Konami games
Crossover racing games
Video games developed in Japan